Events in the year 1163 in Norway.

Incumbents
Monarch: Magnus V Erlingsson

Events
 The first .
 The Norwegian Law of Succession was introduced.
 Archbishop Eysteinn Erlendsson crowned Magnus V of Norway. This was the first time such a ceremony had taken place in Norway.

Arts and literature

Births

Deaths
29 September – Sigurd Markusfostre, pretender and rival king (born c. 1155).

References

Norway